Sian Evans is a Welsh singer. Throughout the 2000s, she was front woman and singer-songwriter of the band Kosheen, a trip-hop/drum & bass group that, during that decade, placed two albums within the Top Ten of the UK Albums Chart. She has also joined a list of Welsh artists to have topped the UK Singles Chart with collaboration on the track "Louder" with DJ Fresh. Kosheen disbanded in 2016.

Discography

Studio albums with Kosheen

As featured artist

References

External links
 Official website

1971 births
Living people
British dance musicians
21st-century Welsh women singers
Welsh singer-songwriters
Welsh electronic musicians